Phyllonorycter melacoronis is a moth of the family Gracillariidae. It is known from Japan (Kyushu), the Russian Far East and Korea.

The wingspan is 5-5.5 mm.

The larvae feed as leaf miners on Rhododendron species, including Rhododendron dauricum and Rhododendron mucronulatum. The mine has the form of an elliptical blotch-mine, located on the underside of the leaf, arbitrarily on a space between the mid-vein and the leaf margin.

References

melacoronis
Moths of Asia

Moths of Japan
Moths of Korea
Moths described in 1963
Insects of Russia
Taxa named by Tosio Kumata
Leaf miners